Vice admiral Alexander Victor Campbell CB, DSO, MVO (27 September 1874 – 2 June 1957) was a Royal Navy officer who became Admiral Superintendent of Malta Dockyard.

Naval career
Campbell was promoted a lieutenant. He was appointed to the battleship HMS London on 31 May 1902, serving temporary as gunnery lieutenant during the first weeks.

Promoted to captain on 30 June 1913, Campbell became commanding officer of the battleship HMS Vengeance in May 1914 and the battleship HMS Prince George in August 1914, shortly after the start of World War I. He went on to be commanding officer of the battleship HMS Albion in February 1916, commanding officer of the battleship HMS Britannia in May 1916 and Chief of Staff to the Commander-in-Chief, The Nore in July 1916. He later became commanding officer of the battleship HMS King George V in April 1918.

After the War Campbell became Captain of the Fleet, Mediterranean Fleet in September 1919 and Commodore of the Royal Naval Barracks, Chatham in May 1922. Promoted to rear admiral on 14 October 1923, he became Admiral Superintendent of Malta Dockyard in March 1926. He was promoted to vice admiral on 11 June 1928.

References

1874 births
1957 deaths
Royal Navy vice admirals
Companions of the Order of the Bath
Companions of the Distinguished Service Order
Members of the Royal Victorian Order
Burials at Barnes Cemetery